Sir Arthur Leonard Williams  (22 January 1904 – 27 December 1972) was a British politician who was General Secretary of the Labour Party during the 1960s.

Early life 
Born in Liverpool in 1904, he began working on the steam engines of the railway as a boy, doing the dirty jobs of cleaning out the ashes and the boilers on the engines.  He became involved in the union movement after World War I, rising through various positions to attain the position of General Secretary of the British Labour Party.  After retiring from that post he was knighted and appointed Governor-General of Mauritius in 1968 and served in that capacity until his death.  He was also involved in the Scout movement.

He was married to Margaret Alma I. S. Wiggins (born Oxton, England 1904).  There were no children of the marriage.

References

1904 births
1972 deaths
Labour Party (UK) officials
Governors-General of Mauritius
Knights Grand Cross of the Order of St Michael and St George
Deaths in Mauritius